David Lindsey may refer to:
 David L. Lindsey (born 1944), American novelist
 David Lindsey (politician) (born 1931), member of the Florida House of Representatives

See also
 David Lindsay (disambiguation)